Cylinder is a  subgenus  of sea snails, marine gastropod mollusks in the genus Conus, in the family Conidae, the cone snails and their allies.

In the new classification of the family Conidae by Puillandre N., Duda T.F., Meyer C., Olivera B.M. & Bouchet P. (2015), Cylinder has become a subgenus of Conus: Conus (Cylinder) Petuch & Sargent, 2012   represented as Conus Thiele, 1929. The same study found Cylinder to be polyphyletic, but morphologically consistent, possibly corresponding to grades. Conus ammiralis, Conus canonicus and Conus dalli cluster with the type species Conus textile, the others form a separate clade.

Distinguishing characteristics
The Tucker & Tenorio 2009 taxonomy distinguishes Cylinder from Conus in the following ways:

 Genus Conus Linnaeus, 1758
 Shell characters (living and fossil species)
The basic shell shape is conical to elongated conical, has a deep anal notch on the shoulder, a smooth periostracum and a small operculum. The shoulder of the shell is usually nodulose and the protoconch is usually multispiral. Markings often include the presence of tents except for black or white color variants, with the absence of spiral lines of minute tents and textile bars.
Radular tooth (not known for fossil species) 
The radula has an elongated anterior section with serrations and a large exposed terminating cusp, a non-obvious waist, blade is either small or absent and has a short barb, and lacks a basal spur.
Geographical distribution
These species are found in the Indo-Pacific region.
Feeding habits
These species eat other gastropods including cones.

 Subgenus Cylinder Montfort, 1810
Shell characters (living and fossil species)
The shell is ovate to elongated in shape.  The protoconch is multispiral, the spire is conical to convex in shape.  The anal notch is deep.  The shell is conspicuously ornamented with rows of tents or textile bars.  The periostracum is smooth, and the operculum is small.
Radular tooth (not known for fossil species)
The anterior section of the radula is substantially more elongated than the posterior section.  The waist is not obvious.  A basal spur is absent, and the barb is short.  The blade and a terminating cusp are present.
Geographical distribution
All but one species in this genus are found in the Indo-Pacific region; Cylinder dalli is found in the Eastern Pacific region.
Feeding habits
These species are molluscivorous (meaning that they prey on other mollusks).

Species list
This list of species is based on the information in the World Register of Marine Species (WoRMS) list. Species within the genus Cylinder include:
 Cylinder abbas (Hwass in Bruguière, 1792): synonym of  Conus abbas Hwass in Bruguière, 1792
 Cylinder ammiralis Linnaeus, 1758: synonym of Conus (Cylinder) ammiralis Linnaeus, 1758, represented as Conus ammiralis Linnaeus, 1758
 Cylinder aureus (Hwass in Bruguière, 1792): synonym of  Conus aureus Hwass in Bruguière, 1792
 Cylinder barbieri (G. Raybaudi Massilia, 1995): synonym of  Conus barbieri G. Raybaudi Massilia, 1995
 Cylinder bengalensis (Okutani, 1968): synonym of  Conus bengalensis (Okutani, 1968)
 Cylinder biancae (Bozzetti, 2010): synonym of Conus biancae Bozzetti, 2010
 Cylinder canonicus (Hwass in Bruguière, 1792): synonym of  Conus canonicus Hwass in Bruguière, 1792
 Cylinder dalli (Stearns, 1873): synonym of  Conus dalli Stearns, 1873
 Cylinder dondani (Kosuge, 1981): synonym of  Conus dondani Kosuge, 1981
 Cylinder erythrostoma (Meuschen, 1787): synonym of Miniaceoliva miniacea (Röding, 1798)
 Cylinder gloriamaris (Chemnitz, 1777): synonym of  Conus gloriamaris Chemnitz, 1777
 Cylinder glorioceanus (Poppe & Tagaro, 2009): synonym of  Conus glorioceanus Poppe & Tagaro, 2009
 Cylinder legatus (Lamarck, 1810): synonym of  Conus legatus Lamarck, 1810
 Cylinder nodulosus (G.B. Sowerby II, 1864): synonym of  Conus nodulosus G.B. Sowerby II, 1864
 Cylinder pacificus (Moolenbeek & Röckel, 1996): synonym of  Conus pacificus Moolenbeek & Röckel, 1996
 Cylinder paulucciae (G. B. Sowerby III, 1887): synonym of Cylinder aureus paulucciae (G. B. Sowerby III, 1887) represented as Conus aureus paulucciae G. B. Sowerby III, 1887
 Cylinder priscai Bozzetti, 2012: synonym of Conus (Cylinder) priscai Bozzetti, 2012 represented as Conus priscai (Bozzetti, 2012)
 Cylinder retifer (Menke, 1829): synonym of  Conus retifer Menke, 1829
 Cylinder scottjordani (Poppe, Monnier & Tagaro, 2012): synonym of Conus (Cylinder) scottjordani (Poppe, Monnier & Tagaro, 2012) represented as Conus scottjordani (Poppe, Monnier & Tagaro, 2012)
 Cylinder tagaroae Limpalaër & Monnier, 2013: synonym of Conus (Cylinder) tagaroae (Limpalaër & Monnier, 2013) represented as Conus tagaroae (Limpalaër & Monnier, 2013)
 Cylinder telatus (Reeve, 1848): synonym of  Conus telatus Reeve, 1848
 Cylinder textile (Linnaeus, 1758): synonym of  Conus textile Linnaeus, 1758
 Cylinder victoriae (Reeve, 1843): synonym of  Conus victoriae Reeve, 1843

References

Further reading 
 Kohn A. A. (1992). Chronological Taxonomy of Conus, 1758-1840". Smithsonian Institution Press, Washington and London.
 Monteiro A. (ed.) (2007). The Cone Collector 1: 1-28.
 Berschauer D. (2010). Technology and the Fall of the Mono-Generic Family The Cone Collector 15: pp. 51-54
 Puillandre N., Meyer C.P., Bouchet P., and Olivera B.M. (2011), Genetic divergence and geographical variation in the deep-water Conus orbignyi complex (Mollusca: Conoidea)'', Zoologica Scripta 40(4) 350-363.

External links
 To World Register of Marine Species
  Gastropods.com: Conidae setting forth the genera recognized therein.

Conidae
Gastropod subgenera